"Hands on the Wheel" (stylized as "Hands on tHe WHeel") is a song by American hip hop recording artist Schoolboy Q, released on April 3, 2012 as the second single from his second album, Habits & Contradictions (2012). The song, produced by Best Kept Secret, features a guest verse from fellow American rapper A$AP Rocky. The song samples American musician Kid Cudi's hit single "Pursuit of Happiness", as performed live by American folk singer Lissie.

Background
After announcing his signing to Interscope Records in March 2012, Interscope released "Hands on the Wheel" as a single via iTunes and began promoting the song at Urban and Rhythmic radio formats in North America. The song would become his first to feature a placement on any of the Billboard charts.

Chart performance

Certifications

Release history

References

2012 singles
2012 songs
Schoolboy Q songs
ASAP Rocky songs
Top Dawg Entertainment singles
Songs written by Schoolboy Q
Songs written by Kid Cudi
Songs written by ASAP Rocky
Interscope Records singles
Black-and-white music videos